The Clyne Valley Country Park is an area of parkland in Britain, at Swansea in south Wales. It is an area of once splendid woodland with enormous beech, ash and oak trees mainly on the Mumbles side of the Clyne River, and, on the Swansea side, woods and mainly scrub land that has naturally regenerated a reclaimed refuse tip. The valley forms an important link in the ecological corridor that runs from the Brecon Beacons and the Black Mountain across commons and on into the Gower AONB. The Area of Outstanding Natural Beauty forms part of the valley's boundary along Clyne Common. Now  dormant – apart from the rich habitat that has formed from neglect – the valley at one time was part of the Vivian estate. During the eighteenth and nineteenth centuries it was a highly active industrial area with a long history of coal mining, mineral workings, brick making, charcoal burning, railways and canals.

Clyne Valley Community Project

The Clyne Valley Community Project (CVCP)  is a grass roots project that has grown out of  community concern that the valley, a valuable local resource and a part of the local heritage, is neglected and under-used. The aims of the project are:

 To improve access to the Clyne Valley by clearing and restoring a network of once used tracks and paths.   
 To develop and encourage the use of the valley as a community resource by organising events and developing and supporting a wide range of activities in which the communities around the valley can participate.
 To encourage and promote biodiversity and to protect and enhance the natural habitat of species.
 To discover, explore and record evidence of the historical heritage of the valley

Cycling in the Park

A cycle track crosses the centre of the valley, linking Blackpill on Swansea Bay with the inland village of  Gowerton.  It forms part of National Cycle Route 4 and passes close to the settlements of Killay and Dunvant.  The route of the cycle track was once used by the Heart of Wales Line.  Past industrial use is still evident along the track.

The wooded hillsides of the Clyne Valley have numerous dirt trails, used for mountain biking and walks.

In 2009 Swansea Council launched the Clyne Valley Management Plan  to develop the use of the valley for leisure activities. The plan is grant-funded through the Forestry Commission's 'Better Woodlands for Wales' scheme, and includes a substantial investment into Mountain Bike facilities in Clyne. Several kilometres of new purpose-built way-marked mountain bike trails are being constructed as part of the plan. The Clyne Riders  group has been specially constituted for this task.

References

External links
Photos of the Clyne Valley Country Park
Clyne Valley Community Project
Better Woodlands for Wales
Clyne Riders
The River Clyne in flood in 2016
Clyne Wood Slime Moulds

Parks in Swansea
Country parks in Wales
Mountain biking venues in the United Kingdom
Rail trails in Wales